A list of films produced in Egypt in 1962. For an A-Z list of films currently on Wikipedia, see :Category:Egyptian films.

External links
 Egyptian films of 1962 at the Internet Movie Database
 Egyptian films of 1962 elCinema.com

Lists of Egyptian films by year
1962 in Egypt
Lists of 1962 films by country or language